The Odds Against is a 1966 American short documentary film directed by Lee R. Bobker. It was nominated for an Academy Award for Best Documentary Short.

See also
 Psychiatric Nursing
 The Revolving Door

References

External links

Watch The Odds Against on YouTube

1966 films
1966 documentary films
American short documentary films
1960s short documentary films
Documentary films about incarceration in the United States
Films directed by Lee R. Bobker
1960s English-language films
1960s American films